Ephormotris dilucidalis is a moth in the family Crambidae. It was described by Félix Édouard Guérin-Méneville in 1832. It is found on Sumatra and Java.

References

Acentropinae
Moths described in 1832
Taxa named by Félix Édouard Guérin-Méneville